Galhenage Rathnapala Perera  (born 13 November 1939 ජී. ආර්. පෙරේරා [Sinhala]) is an actor in Sri Lankan cinema, theatre, and television. He has acted in more than 600 television serials, with a career spanning for over five decades.

Personal life
Rathnapala Perera was born on 13 November 1939 in Kirulapone as the eldest of the family. The family soon shifted to Egodawatta, Boralesgamuwa. He has two younger brothers and one younger sister. His father was a businessman and a gambling addict. His mother was a teacher. He received his education from Rattanapitiya Ananda Vidyalaya and Kotahena Prince College, Colombo 13.

His wife is a teledrama producer. The couple has two daughters and one son. His youngest daughter, Yamuna Erandathi, is a teledrama actress and an honours graduate in Information Technology.

Career
He was introduced into the drama by his close friend and renowned dramatist Tissa Abeysekara. Abeysekara along with Perera and Prema Ranjith Thilakaratna, Dharmasiri Wickramaratna, Wickrama Bogoda formed a drama group Ape Kattiya led by dramatist Sugathapala de Silva. He acted in the stage drama Boarding Karayo made by the group. The drama won the award for the Best Drama in 1961 State Drama Festival. In 1962, he played a minor role in the stage play Ranthodu directed by Dharmasiri Wickramaratna. In 1963, he acted in Premaranjith Tilakaratne's debut play Waguru Bima. He has acted in seven stage plays.

He started film career with 1971 film Welikathara directed by D.B. Nihalsinghe with a minor role. His first major role came in his second film of the career, Kalu Diya Dahara directed by Manik Sandarasagara. His maiden television acting came through the serial Thunkal Sihinaya directed by Tissa Abeysekara. His role "Malakada Bass" in the serial Doo Daruwo was the turning point of his teledrama career. He has acted in six foreign films which include three Indian, two American, and one German film.

Selected television serials

 Adaraneeya Poornima
 Adaraneeya Amma 
 Amaya 
 Ammai Thaththai
 Aparna
 Athuru Paara
 Bim Kaluwara
 Bodhi
 Bogala Sawundiris 
 Chakraudhaya 
 Damini
 Diyaniyo
 Dolosmahe Gangawa
 Doo Daruwo
 Ekamath Eka Rataka 
 Eth Kanda Lihini
 Ganga Addara Kele
 Gangawa Tharanaya
 Handapana 
 Heeye Manaya 
 Indikadolla
 Isisara Isawwa
 Kadupul Mal
 Kammiththa
 Kapa Nasna Samaya
 Kasee Salu 
 Katu Imbula 
 Kombi
 Kula Kumariya 
 Kulawamiya
 Mahagedara
 Mahathala Hatana 
 Maheshika
 Maya Agni
 Mehew Rate
 Monara Kirilli 
 Nilla Penena Manaya 
 Ran Mehesi 
 Sakki 
 Sanda Hiru Tharu
 Sanda Maddahana
 Sanda Nodutu Sanda
 Sankuru Maruthaya 
 Santhuwaranaya
 Sathyangana 
 Sihina Genena Kumariye
 Sil 
 Siri Sirimal
 Situwarayo
 Suddilage Kathawa 
 Sudu Hamine
 Tharupaba
 Theth Saha Viyali 
 Thunkal Sihinaya
 Wanabime Sirakaruwo

Filmography

Awards
In 1980, he won a critic award for the role in movie Karumakkarayo.  In 2007, he won the award for Best Supporting Actor for the role in the teleplay Chakrayudaya. He won the award for acting in the most number of teledramas at Raigam Tele'es.

References

External links
 Chat with G.R. Perera
 කෝ මගේ මිතුරා
 ඇඳුම් බෑගය අමතක වී ජී. ආර්. ට අකරතැබ්බයක්
 ජී. ආර්. ආයෙත්

Sri Lankan male film actors
Living people
Sinhalese male actors
1939 births